Fencing at the 2010 Asian Games was held in Guangda Gymnasium, Guangzhou, China from November 18 to 23, 2010.

Schedule

Medalists

Men

Women

Medal table

Participating nations
A total of 221 athletes from 23 nations competed in fencing at the 2010 Asian Games:

References
Men's Individual Foil Results
Men's Individual Epée Results
Men's Team Epée Results
Men's Individual Sabre Results
Men's Team Sabre Results
Women's Individual Epée Results
Women's Individual Foil Results
Women's Team Foil Results
Women's Individual Sabre Results
Women's Team Sabre Results

External links
Fencing Site of 2010 Asian Games 

 
2010
2010 Asian Games events
Asian Games
2010 Asian Games